The Oxford History of England (1934–1965) was a notable book series on the history of the United Kingdom. Published by Oxford University Press, it was originally intended to span from Roman Britain to the outbreak of the First World War in fourteen volumes written by eminent historians. Its series editor, Sir George Clark, contributed the first volume which appeared in 1934. The series as originally contemplated was completed in 1961. However, it was subsequently expanded and updated by further volumes and editions, taking the narrative as far as the end of the Second World War. Several volumes were subsequently "replaced" by revised editions of which the last was added in 1986.

Some of the volumes are considered to be classic works for their respective periods and some have been reissued as stand-alone works. The reputation of the series as a whole, however, is mixed. John Bossy wrote in 1996 that it "does not much ring in the mind" except for volumes 1, 2 and 15 (by Collingwood, Stenton and Taylor). Patrick Wormald in 1981 similarly praised the same volumes (and "perhaps" volume 12 by Watson) as "among the successes of a not entirely happy series".

A New Oxford History of England was commissioned in 1992 and has produced eleven volumes to date. At least six volumes are still forthcoming.

Volumes and authors
The volumes in the series are:

Volume I: Roman Britain and the English Settlements – R. G. Collingwood and J. N. L. Myres (1936)
Later replaced by:
Volume I A: Roman Britain — Peter Salway (1981)
Volume I B: The English Settlements — J. N. L. Myres (1986)
Volume II: Anglo-Saxon England, c550–1087 — Sir Frank Stenton (1943)
Volume III: From Domesday Book to Magna Carta, 1087–1216 — Austin L. Poole (1951)
Volume IV: The Thirteenth Century, 1216–1307 — Sir Maurice Powicke (1953)
Volume V: The Fourteenth Century, 1307–1399 — May McKisack (1959)
Volume VI: The Fifteenth Century, 1399–1485 — E. F. Jacob (1961)
Volume VII: The Earlier Tudors, 1485–1558 — J. D. Mackie (1952)
Volume VIII: The Reign of Elizabeth, 1558–1603 — J. B. Black (1936)
Volume IX: The Early Stuarts, 1603–1660 — Godfrey Davies (1937)
Volume X: The Later Stuarts, 1660–1714 — Sir George Clark (1934)
Volume XI: The Whig Supremacy, 1714–1760 — Basil Williams (1939)
2nd edition revised by C. H. Stuart (1962) 
Volume XII: The Reign of George III, 1760–1815 — J. Steven Watson (1960)
Volume XIII: The Age of Reform, 1815–1870 — Sir Llewellyn Woodward (1938)
Volume XIV: England, 1870–1914 — Sir Robert Ensor (1936)
Volume XV: English History, 1914–1945 — A. J. P. Taylor (1965)

Several volumes were subsequently revised by the authors to take into account later research.

Use of the term England
When the series was commissioned:

"England" was still an all-embracing word. It meant indiscriminately England and Wales; Great Britain; the United Kingdom; and even the British Empire. (A. J. P. Taylor, Volume XV: English History, 1914–1945, page v)

Since then there has been a trend in history to restrict the use of the term England to the state that existed pre-1707 and to the geographic area it covered and people it contained in the period thereafter. The different authors interpreted "English history" differently, with Taylor opting to write the history of the British people, including the people of Wales, Scotland, Ireland, Empire and Commonwealth where they shared a history with England, but ignoring them where they did not. Other authors opted to treat non-English matters within their remit.

See also
Pelican History of England (1955–1965)

References 

1934 non-fiction books
Series of history books
History of England, Oxford
Book series introduced in 1934